Fudbalski klub Radnički 1923, commonly known as Radnički Kragujevac, is a professional football club from Kragujevac, Serbia and the major part of the Radnički Kragujevac Sports Society. The name Radnički means "Labourers'" in Serbian and its roots come from the relation the club had with labour movements during the first half of the 20th century.

History

Early years
The club was formed in 1923, during an assembly in the Park restaurant in Kragujevac, under the name Mladi Radnik. The first club president was Aleksandar Ratković. The first match played Mladi Radnik against local club SK Triglav and lost 2–0. The first visitor for a match against Mladi Radnik was SK Radnički from Belgrade. The match was played on 16 August 1925, and SK Radnički won 5–0. One week later, the club won its first match against Radnički Niš with 7–1.

In 1929, Mladi Radnik changed its name to Radnički, an adjective invoking labour and workers in Serbian, as its roots come from the relation the club had with labour movements during the first half of the 20th century.

The club's stature and significance began increasing from 1933. It got its own stadium in 1935, and the first match at the new stadium was played on 18 August 1935, against local rivals Slavija, which was won by 1–0 and the first goal scored Jeremija Nikolić. At that time the club had also a number of international matches. Radnički was in the prewar years of the World War II host of teams like Olympique Marseille, Ferencváros and Honvéd Budapest, Rapid Wien and some others.  The club competed in the highest league of the Kragujevac Football Subassociation which gave access to the qualifiers for the Yugoslav Championship. Radnički won the Subassociation league in 1934, 1935, 1938 and 1939, however it only managed to qualify once to the national league, in the 1935–36 season. They had a fierce rivalry with FK Šumadija 1903 in this period.

Tragic days (1941–1944)
 During World War II, the Kingdom of Yugoslavia was invaded and partitioned by the Axis powers, and Kragujevac were occupied by Nazi Germany soldiers and underwent a number of tragic days during war. The local population were suppressed and many Serbian civilians, as well Roma and Jews, were murdered or have perished in concentration camps. The follow, many citizens of Kragujevac joined the resistance in the country and fought against the fascist occupation. The Nazis had issued an order to kill 50 Serbian civilians for every wounded German soldier and 100 for each German soldier killed. Especially tragic was the days between 19 and 21 October 1941, when German Nazis assembled thousand of males from the town between the ages of sixteen and sixty, and were executed, today known as the Kragujevac massacre. Among the killed was many boys taken directly from schools and their teachers, which had a strong influence on subsequent generations of the city. The massacre was a direct reprisal for the German losses in battles. The executions in Kragujevac occurred although there had been no attacks on members of the Wehrmacht in this city, for the reason that not enough hostages could be found elsewhere. Radnički lost during the war numerous players, club officials and a whole generation of club supporters. Therefore, comes mainly the especially deep-rooted antifascist attitude of the city, the club and its supporters. To commemorate the victims of the massacre, the whole village of Šumarice, where the killings took place, was turned into a memorial park, called Šumarice Memorial Park, and it was built the Museum of Genocide in Kragujevac, not so far from the stadium. After the liberation of Kragujevac in 1944, the club continues to rapidly develop into a bigger football club in the country.

1946–1970

In 1946, Radnički played against Red Star Belgrade for membership of the newly created Yugoslav First League. There were so many fans that the City Stadium was too small to accommodate all visitors. Then, the city and the club decided to build a new stadium. After eight years of construction, the new stadium was ready to be opened. The official opening took place on 6 June, in 1957, against Partizan Belgrade and ended with 2–2. In 1969, Radnički was promoted for the first time to the Yugoslav First League after beating Sutjeska Nikšić and FK Crvenka in the play-offs. During the season, Radnički had a great 4–1 victory over Partizan Belgrade at JNA Stadium. On this 7 September, in 1969, the Radnički fans support their team particularly fanatical. The atmosphere was so fantastic that it was compared with the atmosphere at Old Trafford stadium in Manchester (statements from local and foreign journalists and opponents). On this day the Radnički fans and the club were given the nickname Crveni Đavoli (English: Red Devils), after the nickname for Manchester United. After that game, the Brazilian football giant FC Santos with the legendary Pelé was so impressed by the atmosphere, instead of the friendly game against Partizan, they drove to Kragujevac and played against Radnički. They were not disappointed. 40,000 spectators were in the Čika Dača Stadium and around the stadium were a further seven to eight thousand enthusiastic fans. Radnički achieved in a legendary atmosphere a 4–4 draw. At the end of the domestic championship, Radnički was 15th in their first top league season and the survival was ensured on the last round with a victory over Vojvodina by 1–0.

1971–1976
The 1971, Radnički finished the season as 17th and narrowly avoided the relegation. The following 1971/72 season, the club returned to the Yugoslav Second League. However, the return to the first league is not a long time coming. Radnički managed to get back among the best teams of the former Yugoslavia and to play two more seasons in the top division, before they went at the end of the 1975/76 season the way to the second division. Then comes the drought period of the club for two decades.

1998–present
Since the relegation in 1976, the club was no longer member of the top division. The civil war during the 90s (1992–1995), the inflation and the UN sanctions have hit the state and his population hard. The club relegated even several times in the third league, but the final return in the first league occurred in 1998. It followed the longest period in the first division, in total for four seasons, before they went at the end of the 2001/02 season again the way to the second division. In 2010, FK Šumadija Radnički 1923 was a short lived name of the club during the 2009/10 season after the fusion with FK Šumadija 1903. The old name Radnički was returned and changed to Radnički Kragujevac. However, 2010 marked a turning point for the club, which achieved the promotion, and returning to the top flight, the Serbian SuperLiga, in 2011, where it remained until nowadays.

Club colours and crest
The name of the town Kragujevac derived from the Serbian word "kraguj", which is a name used for a particular species of hawk from the genus Accipiter, which in the Middle Ages often nested in the city and its surrounding region, and was appreciated by the population as they were used partially for hunting. Thus the name means "Kraguj City". Today, the Kraguj occupies a place of honor on the city's coat of arms and also on the crest of the club. The typical colours of Radnički are mainly red, but the club used also as away kit, an all-turquoise jersey.

Stadium

The home field of Radnički Kragujevac is the Čika Dača Stadium. It is named in memory of Danilo Stojanović, known as Čika Dača, who is considered to be a pioneer of football in Serbia. The construction of the stadium was finished on 6 June, in 1957, and had a capacity for up to 40,000 spectators. After renovations in 2007, the stadium new capacity is 15,100 seats.

Further development
For the stadium are planned several phases of reconstructions. The first phase includes the installation of 1,400 lux strong floodlights of the brand Philips and new locker and club rooms, while for the next phase planned the full reconstruction of the west stand (inclusive covering), the press and the VIP lounge. Then will follow the construction of the east stand, so that it fulfills the UEFA standards for European matches. The first phase started in July 2012.

Supporters

Since its foundation, Radnički always had considerable number of supporters. The first organized support of Radnički fans was recorded on 29 July, in 1934. About 600 Radnički fans drove to Belgrade for a match against BASK. The real spectator boom began in the late sixties, were Radnički was promoted for the first time to the top level. At that time began the first approaches of modern organized support. The away match against Partizan should make history. On this 7 September, in 1969, the Radnički fans support their team particularly fanatical and the atmosphere was so fantastic that it was compared with the atmosphere at Old Trafford stadium in Manchester (statements from local and foreign journalists and opponents). On this day, the Radnički fans and the club were given the nickname Crveni Đavoli (English: The Red Devils), after the nickname for Manchester United. However, the first organized meeting of the Crveni Djavoli was on 9 March, in 1989. Together, the fans went to a basketball game and the Djavoli took advantage of this day as the day of its official founding. Today, they are always on the southside of the Čika Dača Stadium, from where they fiery support their club. Besides football, they also support other sport sections of the Radnički Kragujevac Sport Association.

Club honours and achievements

Domestic

Yugoslavia
 Yugoslav Second League
 Winners: 1968–69, 1973–74
 Kragujevac Football Subassociation
 Winners: 1935, 1936, 1938, 1939

Serbia
 Serbian First League
 Winners: 2020–21
Runners-up: 2010–11
 Serbian League West
 Winners: 2016–17

Individual awards
Serbian SuperLiga top scorer

Players

Current squad

Out on loan

Notable players
To appear in this section a player must have either:
 Played at least 80 games for the club.
 Set a club record or won an individual award while at the club.
 Played at least one international match for their national team at any time.

 Vinko Begović
 Predrag Đorđević
 Srboljub Krivokuća
 Žarko Olarević
 Predrag Spasić
 Sava Paunović
 Aleksandar Stojanović
 Goran Drulić
 Ognjen Koroman
 Ivica Kralj
 Radovan Krivokapić
 Nenad Lalatović
 Bojan Mališić
 Stanimir Milošković
 Radovan Radaković
 Zoran Radosavljević
 Đorđe Rakić
 Saša Stevanović
 Filip Kostić
 Petar Raković
 Luka Milivojević
 Darko Spalević
 Nemanja Tomić
 Aleksandar Kosorić
 Momčilo Stojanović
 Nenad Erić
 Dragan Čadikovski
 Toni Jakimovski
 Marko Simić
 An Il-bom
 Myong Cha-hyon
 Ri Kwang-il

For the list of current and former players with Wikipedia article, please see: :Category:FK Radnički Kragujevac players.

Club officials
Updated 20 July 2022

Historical list of coaches

Kit manufacturers and shirt sponsors

References

External links
 Official
 Official website 
 Other
 Radnički Kragujevac on Facebook

 
Football clubs in Serbia
Association football clubs established in 1923
Football clubs in Yugoslavia
Sport in Kragujevac
1923 establishments in Serbia